Philip I, Count of Nassau-Wiesbaden-Idstein (1490 in Cologne – 16 June 1558) was member of the House of Nassau who ruled the County of Nassau-Wiesbaden-Idstein.

Early life 
He was born as the only son of Count Adolph III and his wife, Countess Margaret of Hanau-Lichtenberg. After his father died in 1511, he became the ruler in his own right.

Marriage and issue 
In 1514, he married Adriana of Glymes, the daughter of John III of Bergen op Zoom.  They had five children:
 Catherine (1515-1540), married in 1538 to John II of Hohenfels
 Philip II (1516-1566)
 Margaret (1517-1596)
 Adolph (1518-1556), married in 1543 to Countess Françoise of Luxembourg, the daughter of Charles I, Count of Ligny
 Balthasar (1520-1568)

House of Nassau
Counts of Nassau
1490 births
1558 deaths
16th-century German people
Counts of Nassau-Wiesbaden-Idstein